Persailhorn (elevation ) is a summit in the Steinernes Meer of the Berchtesgaden Alps in the Austrian state of Salzburg.

Alpinism 
The Persailhorn is a prominent rocky summit above the valley of Saalfelden and above the lower Kienalkopf, where also the closest shelter, the Peter-Wiechenthaler hut is located. The next summit to the west is Mitterhorn.
 
There are two Via Ferrata B-C and an alpine hiking path from the hut that all lead in approximately 2 hours to the summit. Another alpine path, the Saalfeldener Höhenweg, leads over Mitterhorn and Breithorn to the hut Riemannhaus.

Mountains of the Alps
Two-thousanders of Austria